{{Infobox military unit
| unit_name                     = 11th Panzer Division
| native_name                   = 11. Panzerdivision— 11. PzDiv —<span style="color:#00AEEF;">XX</span>
| image                         = 
| image_size                    = 
| caption                       = (tactical symbol Panzer unit)
| dates                         = 1 August 1940 – 8 May 1945
| country                       = 
| branch                        = German Heer
| type                          = Panzer
| role                          = Armoured warfare
| size                          = Division 
| command_structure             =  Wehrmacht
| garrison                      = Wehrkreis VIII: Sagan
| garrison_label                = 
| motto                         = 
| colors                        = 
| march                         = 
| mascot                        = 
| battles                       = World War II
 Invasion of Yugoslavia
 Operation Barbarossa
 Case Blue
 Battle of Kursk
 Korsun-Cherkassy Pocket
 Battle of the Bulge
| notable_commanders            = 
| anniversaries                 = 
| identification_symbol         = 
| identification_symbol_label   = 1940
| identification_symbol_2       = 
| identification_symbol_2_label = at Kursk
| identification_symbol_3       = 
| identification_symbol_3_label = Ghost
| identification_symbol_4       = 
| identification_symbol_4_label = 
}}

The 11th Panzer Division' was an armoured division in the German Army during World War II, established in 1940.

The division saw action on the Eastern and Western Fronts during the Second World War. The 11th Panzer Division did not participate in the war until the invasion of Yugoslavia. It fought in the Soviet Union from 1941 to 1944 and, in the last year of the war, in southern France and Germany. The formation's emblem was a ghost.

History
The 11th Panzer Division was formed on 1 August 1940 from the 11th Schützen-Brigade and the Panzer Regiment 15 removed from the 5th Panzer Division and elements of the 231st Infantry Division, 311th Infantry Division and 209th Infantry Division. Most of its members were from Silesia (Wehrkreis VIII).

The 11th Panzer Division saw action for the first time in the invasion of Yugoslavia in April 1941. Passing through Bulgaria, it arrived in Belgrade and assisted in the capture of that city.

The division was then sent to the Eastern Front where it was part of the Army Group South. It participated in the Battle of Kiev and later took part in the Battle of Moscow. At the Battle of Moscow Soviet propaganda made a fictional claim about the 11th Panzer Division in the fabricated encounter with Panfilov's Twenty-Eight Guardsmen. The division was engaged in retreat and defensive operations after the Soviet counter offensive in December 1941. The 11th Panzer Division's advance finally came to a halt due to the strong resistance of the 8th Guards Motor Rifle Division and the 78th Rifle Division. Harsh weather conditions were also a factor.

The 11th Panzer Division was part of Case Blue from June 1942 onward, participating in the capture of Voronezh and the drive towards Stalingrad. It avoided being entrapped with the 6th Army in the city but suffered substantial losses during the winter of 1942-43. It was engaged in the failed relief attempt on Stalingrad and then participated in the defence of Rostov, which allowed the German troops retreating from the Caucasus to escape.

During operations on the Eastern Front around the Chir River. The 11th Panzer Division acted as a fire brigade going wherever there was a breakthrough by Soviet Forces. During December the 11th Panzer conducted a series of counter attacks against Soviet forces around the Chir River. On 9 December 1942 the 11th Panzer Division destroyed 53 tanks of the 1st Soviet Tank Corps in a counter attack to relieve the German 336th Infantry Division. On 19 December 1942 the 11th Panzer Division destroyed 42 Russian tanks without losing any of its own tanks just south of Oblivskaya. The division engaged a second Soviet attack destroying 65 more Soviet tanks without suffering any losses. By the end of the day the 11th Panzer Division had destroyed an entire Soviet Mechanized Corps. On 21 December 1942 the 11th Panzer Division destroyed much of the Soviet 5th Tank Army during a counter attack along the Chir. The division suffered heavy losses in the process.

In July 1943, it participated in the Battle of Kursk and the defensive operations and retreat that followed the German failure. It was entrapped in the Korsun-Cherkassy Pocket in February 1944 and almost completely destroyed in the break-out from the pocket. The division was withdrawn from the front and sent to Bordeaux, France after receiving personnel drawn from the 273rd Reserve Panzer Division.

After being stationed in the Toulouse area, the division was moved to a section of the Rhône in July 1944. When the Allies invaded southern France in August 1944 it retreated via the Rhône corridor, reaching Besançon. Later entering combat in Alsace, it helped in the defence of the Belfort Gap and was defeated in the Battle of Arracourt before going back to the Saar. In December 1944, the division fought as part of the Army Group G.

At the beginning of the Battle of the Bulge, which it did not participate in, the division had 3,500 personnel, including 800 infantry. Following the failure of the German offensive, the 11th Panzer Division entered combat in Saarland and Moselle and fought at Remagen with 4,000 soldiers, 25 tanks and 18 guns that still remained, but was expelled from the region by the advancing US forces.

It was then shifted to the southern sector of the front, with its forces stationed in and encircled in the Ruhr. The 11th Panzer Division retreated south east, eventually surrendering to US forces in the area around Passau on 2 May 1945.

Commanders 
The commanders of the division:
 General der Panzertruppe Ludwig Crüwell (1 August 1940 – 15 August 1941)
 Generalleutnant Günther Angern (15 August 1941 – 24 August 1941)
 General der Panzertruppe Hans-Karl Freiherr von Esebeck (24 August 1941 – 20 October 1941)
 Generalleutnant Walter Scheller (20 October 1941 – 16 May 1942)
 General der Panzertruppe Hermann Balck (16 May 1942 – 4 March 1943)
 General der Infanterie Dietrich von Choltitz (4 March 1943 – 15 May 1943)
 Generalmajor Johann Mickl (15 May 1943 – 10 August 1943)
 Generalleutnant Wend von Wietersheim (10 August 1943 – 10 April 1945)
 Generalmajor Horst Freiherr Treusch und Buttlar-Brandenfels (10 April 1945)

Orders of Battle
The organisation of the division:

June 1941
 Divisionstab 33. Panzer-Regiment 11. Schützen-Brigade 61. Kradschützen-Battalion 61. Panzerjäger-Abteilung 231. Aufklärungs-Abteilung 119. Artillerie Regiment 85. Nachrichten-Battalion 86. Pionier-Battalion 71. Flak-Battalion (attached)
 2 / 21.Panzer Luftwaffe Observation Staffel (attached)

July 1943
 Divisionstab 15. Panzer-Regiment 110. Panzergrenadier-Regiment 111. Panzergrenadier-Regiment 61. Panzerjäger-Abteilung 11. Aufklärungs-Abteilung 119. Panzer-Artillerie-Regiment 277. Heeres-Flak-Battalion 209. Panzer-Pioneer-Battalion 89. Panzer-Nachrichten-Battalion 61. Feldersatz-Battalion''

See also 
Organisation of a SS Panzer Division
Panzer division

References

Bibliography
 
 

1*11
Military units and formations established in 1940
Military units and formations disestablished in 1945
Military units and formations of Germany in Yugoslavia in World War II